Kalinovka is a rural locality (a khutor) in Artyukhovsky Selsoviet Rural Settlement, Oktyabrsky District, Kursk Oblast, Russia. Population:

Geography 
The khutor is located on the Dichnya River (a left tributary of the Seym River), 56 km from the Russia–Ukraine border, 31 km south-west of Kursk, 16 km south-west of the district center – the urban-type settlement Pryamitsyno, 3 km from the selsoviet center – Artyukhovka.

 Climate
Kalinovka has a warm-summer humid continental climate (Dfb in the Köppen climate classification).

Transport 
Kalinovka is located 19.5 km from the federal route  Crimea Highway (a part of the European route ), 3 km from the road of regional importance  ("Crimea Highway" – Ivanino, part of the European route ), 12 km from the nearest railway halt 439 km (railway line Lgov I — Kursk).

The rural locality is situated 43 km from Kursk Vostochny Airport, 113 km from Belgorod International Airport and 241 km from Voronezh Peter the Great Airport.

References

Notes

Sources

Rural localities in Oktyabrsky District, Kursk Oblast